Drag the Red is a community volunteer organization in the Canadian province of Manitoba. Founded in 2014 by a group of co-founders that included Kyle Kematch and MLA Bernadette Smith, the organization aims to address the issue of missing and murdered Indigenous women and girls by searching in and around the Red River of the North for bodies or evidence of missing persons.

The group was founded in response to the discovery of the body of Tina Fontaine, an Indigenous teenager, in the Red River. At that time Drag the Red comprised 25 volunteers; in 2019 it was reported that the group had "hundreds". In 2021 the group received a donation of a custom boat commissioned by Unifor.

Drag the Red is the subject of This River, a 2016 short documentary.

References

External links
Video from Vice 

2014 establishments
Missing and Murdered Indigenous Women and Girls movement
Red River of the North
Organizations based in Manitoba